The 2011 MagicJack season was the club's first year of existence under the moniker "MagicJack". Prior to the franchise purchase and relocation, the team had been playing in the Washington, D.C. metropolitan area under the name "Washington Freedom". Including the Freedom's history and records, this is MagicJack's eighth season of existence.

The club finished the regular season in third place, amassing a record of nine wins, two ties and seven losses. During the playoffs, MagicJack won the opening round against Boston Breakers, before being eliminated by Philadelphia Independence in the Super Semifinals.

Standings 
Final regular season standings.

Blue denotes regular season champion, and top seed in 2011 Women's Professional Soccer Playoffs.
Green denotes team has spot in 2011 Women's Professional Soccer Playoffs.

Source: WPS standings*MagicJack was docked one point on 12 May for various violations of league standards.**Boston wins head-to-head 2-1-1 over Sky Blue.

Team 
Final 2011 MagicJack roster

References 

Magicjack
MagicJack
Women's football club seasons
American soccer clubs 2011 season